White Oak High School may refer to:
White Oak High School (North Carolina)
White Oak High School (Oklahoma)
White Oak High School (Texas)